Wampatuck may refer to:

People
Wampatuck or Wompatuck (d. 1669), a leader of the Mattakeesett tribe known to English settlers as Josiah Sagamore. 

Places
Wampatuck Pond, a pond in Hanson, Massachusetts

Ships
, later YTB-337, a United States Navy harbor tug in commission from 1942 to 1946
, a United States Navy armed tug in commission from 1898 to 1931